Panj Pyare (the five beloved ones) is the collective name given to five men − Daya Singh, Dharam Singh, Himmat Singh, Mohkam Singh and Sahib Singh – by the tenth Sikh guru, Guru Gobind Singh during the historic and monumental divan at Anandpur Sahib in the Punjab region of India on March 30, 1699. (The Gregorian calendar skipped 11 days in 1752. So, in present times, Vaisakhi occurs near 13 April every year.)

They formed the nucleus of the Khalsa: the first five persons to receive Khanda di Pahul initiation and rites (baptism) of the two-edged sword. They were the inaugural Panj Pyare. However, the term is not limited only to this inaugural group. After them, any group of five baptized Sikhs are also referred to as the Panj Pyare.

Until the Vaisakhi of AD 1699, the Sikh initiation ceremony was known as Charan Pahul.

Background 
The idea of five beloved ones predate the formalization of the Khalsa Panth by Guru Gobind Singh in 1699. Guru Nanak alludes to the institution of "five beloved sons" in his gurbani.

Throughout Sikh history, there have been five beloved ones during different guruship terms. Examples are given below for some of them:

Guru Arjan 
His five beloved ones were Bhai Bidhi Chand, Bhai Jetha, Bhai Langah, Bhai Pirana, and Bhai Pera.

Guru Tegh Bahadur 
His five beloved ones were Dewan Mati Dasa, Bhai Gurdita (not to be confused with Guru Hargobind's son), Bhai Dayala,  Bhai Ude, and Bhai Jaita (later baptized as Jiwan Singh).

Guru Gobind Singh 
His five beloved ones were the original/inaugural group of Panj Piare as already named in the article.

Story of Vasakhi 
Guru Gobind Das was 33 years old when he had Divine inspiration to actuate his designs and make an undying legacy. Every year at the time of Baisakhi (springtime), thousands of devotees would come to Anandpur to pay their obeisance and seek the Guru's blessings. In early 1699, months before Baisakhi Day, Guru Gobind Das sent special edicts to congregants far and wide that year the Baisakhi was going to be a unique affair. He asked them not to cut any of their hair—to come with unshorn hair under their turbans and chunis, and for the men to come with full beards.

On Baisakhi Day, March 30, 1699, hundreds of thousands of people gathered around his divine temporal seat at Anandpur Sahib. The Guru addressed the congregants with a most stirring oration on his divine mission of restoring their faith and preserving the Sikh religion. After his inspirational discourse, he flashed his unsheathed sword and said that every great deed was preceded by equally great sacrifice: He demanded one head for oblation. "I need a head", he declared. After some trepidation one person offered himself. The Guru took him inside a tent. A little later he reappeared with his sword dripping with blood, and asked for another head. One by one, four more earnest devotees offered their heads. Every time the Guru took a person inside the tent, he came out with a bloodied sword in his hand.

Thinking their Guru to have gone berserk, the congregants started to disperse. Then the Guru emerged with all five men dressed in orange suits with a blue bib. (These are the colors of Sikhism). He baptized the five in a new and unique ceremony called pahul, what Sikhs today know as the baptism ceremony called Amrit. Then the Guru asked those five baptized Sikhs to baptize him as well. This is how he became known as Guru Chela both teacher and student. He then proclaimed that the Panj Pyare—the Five Beloved Ones—would be the embodiment of the Guru himself: "Where there are Panj Pyare, there am I. When the Five meet, they are the holiest of the holy."

He said whenever and wherever five baptized (Amritdhari) Sikhs come together, the Guru would be present. All those who receive Amrit from five baptized Sikhs will be infused with the spirit of courage and strength to sacrifice. Thus with these principles he established Khalsa Panth, the Order of the Pure Ones.

Unique Identity 
At the same time the Guru gave his new Khalsa a unique, indisputable, and distinct identity. The Guru gave the gift of bana, the distinctive Sikh clothing and headwear. He also offered five emblems of purity and courage. These symbols, worn by all baptized Sikhs of both sexes, are popularly known today as Five Ks: 
Kesh, unshorn hair this a gift from god; 
Kangha, the wooden comb, which keeps the tangles out of Sikhs' hair, which shows that God keeps the tangles out of one's life;
Kara, the iron (or steel) bracelet, which has no beginning or end, which shows that God has no beginning or end;
 Kirpan, the sword, used only to defend others weaker than the bearer; and 
Kashera, the underwear worn by Sikhs in battle so they can move freely. 
By being identifiable, no Sikh could ever hide behind cowardice again.

Political tyranny and brutality by Islamic Rulers of the day was not the only circumstance that was lowering people's morale. Discriminatory class distinctions (the Indian "caste" system) were responsible for the people's sense of degradation. The Guru wanted to eliminate the anomalies caused by the caste system. The constitution of the Panj Pyare was the living example of his dream: both the high and low castes were amalgamated into one. Among the original Panj Pyare, there was one Khatri, shopkeeper; one jat, farmer one Chhimba, calico printer/tailor; one jheemar, one kumhar, water-carrier; and one Nai, a barber. Further the five were from distant regions - lahore, Uttar Pradesh, Gujarat and Karnataka odisha.. He gave the surname of Singh (Lion) to every Sikh and also took the name for himself. From Gobind Rai he became Guru Gobind Singh. He also pronounced that all Sikh women embody royalty, and gave them the surname Kaur (Princess). With the distinct Khalsa identity and consciousness of purity Guru Gobind Singh gave all Sikhs the opportunity to live lives of courage, sacrifice, and equality.

The birth of the Khalsa is celebrated by Sikhs every Baisakhi Day on April 13. Baisakhi 1999 marks the 300th anniversary of Guru Gobind Singh's gift of Panth Khalsa to all Sikhs everywhere.

Bibliography
 </ref>

Gurdas, Bhai, Varan
Jaggi, Rattan Singh, ed., Bansavalinama.  Chandigarh, 1972
Kuir Singh, Gurbilas Patshahi 10.  Patiala, 1968
Bhangu, Ratan Singh, Prachin Panth Prakash.  Amritsar, 1962
Santokh Singh, Bhai, Sri Gur Pratap Suraj Granth, Amritsar, 1927–35
Bhalla, Sarup Das, Mahima Prakash.
Gian Singh, Giani, Panth Prakash, Patiala, 1970
Sukha Singh, Gurbilas Dasvin Patshahi, Patiala, 1970

References

 

History of Sikhism